This is a list of football clubs in Kiribati.

Kuria
Maiana
Marakei
Nonouti
Tamana
Tarawa Urban Council
Abaiang
Abemama
Betio Town Council
Makin
Tabiteuea North
Tabiteuea South
Banaba
Beru
Kiritimati
North Tarawa
Onotoa
Aranuka
Arorae
Butaritari
Tabuaeran
Teraina

Kiribati
 
football clubs
Football clubs